The 1923 FA Charity Shield was the tenth staging of the FA Charity Shield, an annual association football match arranged to raise funds for charitable causes supported by the Football Association (the FA), the governing body of football in England. Following a series of matches between club teams, the format of the competition changed in 1923 to a game between select teams of amateur and professional players. The competition used this format for the next four seasons. The match also saw the competition move from a dates in May, as had previously been used, to October. £730 was raised for charities.

The match was played on 8 October 1923 at Stamford Bridge, London, and ended as a 2-0 win for the Professionals. While the first half saw both teams competing, the superior fitness of the Professionals paid off in the second half. Both goals came after half-time, scored by Bradford and Chambers.

Match details

References

FA Community Shield
Charity Shield
Charity Shield
Charity Shield
Charity Shield